In mathematics, especially potential theory, harmonic measure is a concept related to the theory of harmonic functions that arises from the solution of the classical Dirichlet problem.  In probability theory, the harmonic measure of a subset of the boundary of a bounded domain in Euclidean space ,  is the probability that a Brownian motion started inside a domain hits that subset of the boundary. More generally, harmonic measure of an Itō diffusion X describes the distribution of X as it hits the boundary of D. In the complex plane, harmonic measure can be used to estimate the modulus of an analytic function inside a domain D given bounds on the modulus on the boundary of the domain; a special case of this principle is Hadamard's three-circle theorem. On simply connected planar domains, there is a close connection between harmonic measure and  the theory of conformal maps.

The term harmonic measure was introduced by Rolf Nevanlinna in 1928 for planar domains, although Nevanlinna notes the idea appeared implicitly in earlier work by Johansson, F. Riesz, M. Riesz, Carleman, Ostrowski and Julia (original order cited). The connection between harmonic measure and Brownian motion was first identified by Kakutani ten years later in 1944.

Definition

Let D be a bounded, open domain in n-dimensional Euclidean space Rn, n ≥ 2, and let ∂D denote the boundary of D.  Any continuous function f : ∂D → R determines a unique harmonic function Hf that solves the Dirichlet problem

If a point x ∈ D is fixed, by the Riesz–Markov–Kakutani representation theorem and the maximum principle Hf(x) determines a probability measure ω(x, D) on ∂D by

The measure ω(x, D) is called the harmonic measure (of the domain D with pole at x).

Properties

 For any Borel subset E of ∂D, the harmonic measure ω(x, D)(E) is equal to the value at x of the solution to the Dirichlet problem with boundary data equal to the indicator function of E.
 For fixed D and E ⊆ ∂D, ω(x, D)(E) is an harmonic function of x ∈ D and

Hence, for each x and D, ω(x, D) is a probability measure on ∂D.

 If ω(x, D)(E) = 0 at even a single point x of D, then  is identically zero, in which case E is said to be a set of harmonic measure zero. This is a consequence of Harnack's inequality.

Since explicit formulas for harmonic measure are not typically available, we are interested in determining conditions which guarantee a set has harmonic measure zero.

 F. and M. Riesz Theorem: If  is a simply connected planar domain bounded by a rectifiable curve (i.e. if ), then harmonic measure is mutually absolutely continuous with respect to arc length: for all ,  if and only if .
 Makarov's theorem: Let  be a simply connected planar domain. Moreover, harmonic measure on D is mutually singular with respect to t-dimensional Hausdorff measure for all t > 1.

 Dahlberg's theorem: If  is a bounded Lipschitz domain, then harmonic measure and (n − 1)-dimensional Hausdorff measure are mutually absolutely continuous: for all ,  if and only if .

Examples

The Radon–Nikodym derivative  is called the Poisson kernel.
  If  is a simply connected planar domain bounded by a Jordan curve and XD, then  for all  where  is the unique Riemann map which sends the origin to X, i.e. . See Carathéodory's theorem.
 If  is the domain bounded by the Koch snowflake, then there exists a subset  of the Koch snowflake such that  has zero length and full harmonic measure .

The harmonic measure of a diffusion

Consider an Rn-valued Itō diffusion X starting at some point x in the interior of a domain D, with law Px.  Suppose that one wishes to know the distribution of the points at which X exits D.  For example, canonical Brownian motion B on the real line starting at 0 exits the interval (−1, +1) at −1 with probability ½ and at +1 with probability ½, so Bτ(−1, +1) is uniformly distributed on the set {−1, +1}.

In general, if G is compactly embedded within Rn, then the harmonic measure (or hitting distribution) of X on the boundary ∂G of G is the measure μGx defined by

for x ∈ G and F ⊆ ∂G.

Returning to the earlier example of Brownian motion, one can show that if B is a Brownian motion in Rn starting at x ∈ Rn and D ⊂ Rn is an open ball centred on x, then the harmonic measure of B on ∂D is invariant under all rotations of D about x and coincides with the normalized surface measure on ∂D

General references

 

   (See Sections 7, 8 and 9)

References

 P.Jones  and T.Wolff,Hausdorff dimension of Harmonic Measure in the plane, Acta. Math. 161(1988)131-144(MR962097)(90j:31001)
 C.Kenig and T.Toro, Free Boundary regularity  for Harmonic Measores and Poisson Kernels, Ann. of Math. 150(1999)369-454MR 172669992001d:31004)
 C.Kenig, D.PreissandT. Toro, Boundary Structure and Size in terms of Interior and Exterior Harmonic Measures in Higher Dimensions, Jour. ofAmer. Math. Soc.vol22  July 2009,  no3,771-796
 S .G.Krantz,  The Theory and Practice of Conformal Geometry,  Dover Publ.Mineola New York (2016) esp. Ch6 classical case

External links
 

Measures (measure theory)
Potential theory